George J. Hruza is an American dermatologist and medical author affiliated with St. Louis University School of Medicine as a clinical professor with over 40 years in the medical field including serving on dermatology boards across the United States. He recently received the American Academy of Dermatology Association Advocate of the Year award for 2022.

Hruza was born in Prague before moving with his family to New York City and attended New York University,  earning a bachelor's degree (1978) and medical degree (1982) before undertaking his dermatology residency there. After his residency he completed a laser surgery fellowships at Harvard and the University of Wisconsin-Madison and an MBA from Washington University in St. Louis.

Hruza was the president of the American Academy of Dermatology. He has written and published over 150 articles and 4 dermatology textbooks and previously led the St. Louis Metropolitan Medical Society, the American Society for Dermatologic Surgery, and the American Society for Laser Medicine and Surgery.

A list of academic publications can be found here.

References 

Year of birth missing (living people)
Living people
American dermatologists
American textbook writers
New York University alumni
Washington University in St. Louis alumni
Czechoslovak emigrants to the United States
Scientists from Prague

Saint Louis University faculty
American medical researchers
American medical academics